Mehrabpur (Tehsil) is an administrative subdivision of Naushahro Feroze District in the province of Sindh, Pakistan. The tehsil is subdivided into eight Union Councils and is headquartered at the city of Mehrabpur.

Union Councils 
Mehrabpur Taluka is administratively further divided into following 8 Union Councils:
 UC Mehrabpur 1
 UC Mehrabpur 2
 UC Halani
 UC Behlani
 UC Kotri.M.Kabir
 UC Lakha road
 UC Jaindo Rajper
 UC Saeed Pur
 UC Hote Khan Jalbani

 
Talukas of Sindh